"Day In, Day Out" is a popular song with music by Rube Bloom and lyrics by Johnny Mercer and published in 1939.

Background
According to Alec Wilder the song, 56 measures long, has a wonderful, soaring melodic line, free from pretentiousness, but full of passion and intensity which is superbly supported by the lyrics. Although the  catch phrase "day in—day out" sounds like a dull routine, Mercer uses exotic images to contrast with the boring sound of the phrase.

Recordings
The song has been recorded by numerous artists.

Helen Forrest with Artie Shaw and his Orchestra – Bluebird Records 78 rpm single (1939)
Helen Ward with Bob Crosby and his Orchestra (1939) – a #1 hit on the Billboard charts
Horace Silver – Horace Silver Trio (1953)
Frank Sinatra – The Point of No Return (Expanded Edition 2002 – Song recorded April 4, 1953), Come Dance with Me! (1959), Nice 'n' Easy (1960), Sinatra & Sextet: Live in Paris (1994)
Stan Levey Sextet with Dexter Gordon – This Time the Drums on Me (1955)
Billie Holiday – Songs for Distingué Lovers (1957)
Lena Horne with Nat Brandwynne's Orchestra – Lena Horne at the Waldorf Astoria (1957)
Johnny Mathis – Wonderful, Wonderful (1957)  
Petula Clark – Petula Clark in Hollywood (1959)
Judy Garland – Garland at the Grove (1959)
The Four Freshmen and Stan Kenton – Road Show (1960)
Carmen Cavallaro – Swingin' Easy (1962)
Nat King Cole – Let's Face the Music! (1964)
Ella Fitzgerald – Ella Fitzgerald Sings the Johnny Mercer Songbook (1964), Ella at Juan-Les-Pins (1964)
Phyllis Marshall - That Girl (1964)
The Peddlers – Birthday (1969)
Mel Tormé – Night at the Concord Pavilion (1991)
Susannah McCorkle – The Songs of Johnny Mercer (1996)
Margaret Whiting –  Love Songs/Sings for the Starry Eyed (1998)
Dena Derose -  I Can See Clearly Now (2000)
Diana Krall – From This Moment On (2006)
Eliane Elias – Bossa Nova Stories (2008)
Sophie Milman – Take Love Easy (2009)
Bob Dylan – Triplicate (2017)
Sachal Vasandani – Shadow Train'' (2018)

Notes

1939 singles
Songs with music by Rube Bloom
Frank Sinatra songs
Ella Fitzgerald songs
Nancy Wilson (jazz singer) songs
Judy Garland songs
Johnny Mathis songs
1939 songs
Songs with lyrics by Johnny Mercer
Nat King Cole songs
Bluebird Records singles